A Mind Is A Terrible Thing to Read is a mystery novel written by William Rabkin in January, 2009. It is based on the USA Network television series Psych. It has all of the same characters Shawn Spencer, Burton Guster, Henry Spencer, Juliet O'Hara, Carlton Lassiter, and Karen Vick. The book is the first one of the five-part series written by Rabkin. The book also begins with a flashback to Shawn's childhood where his father, Henry, attempts to train his son to follow in his steps.

Shawn and Gus are approached by an old high-school classmate, Dallas Steele, who wants Shawn to use his psychic skills to predict new investments. However, when the investments all turn out to be busts, Dallas reveals he set the two up to fail, thinking it is worth the loss of millions of dollars just to publicly prove Shawn is a fake. Before he can expose Shawn, however, Dallas is killed by a crazed stalker of Shawn's who insists Shawn sent her a psychic message to kill, forcing Shawn to work to clear his name without giving away his secret.

2009 American novels
Novels based on television series
Psych